Dorcadion reitteri is a species of beetle in the family Cerambycidae. It was described by Ludwig Ganglbauer in 1883. It is known from the Caucasus.

References

reitteri
Beetles described in 1883